Semiothisa is a genus of moths in the family Geometridae. It was erected by Jacob Hübner in 1818.

Species
Some species of this genus are:
 Semiothisa albivia (Prout, 1915)
 Semiothisa arenosa (Butler, 1875)
 Semiothisa assimilis Warren, 1899
 Semiothisa butaria Swinhoe, 1904
 Semiothisa cacularia (Oberthür, 1891)
 Semiothisa cararia Swinhoe, 1904
 Semiothisa cinerearia Bremer & Grey, 1853
 Semiothisa clathrata Linnaeus
 Semiothisa coninuaria (Eversmann, 1852)
 Semiothisa crassata (Warren, 1897)
 Semiothisa decorata Warren, 1906
 Semiothisa dentilineata (Warren, 1914)
 Semiothisa destitutaria (Walker, 1861)
 Semiothisa deviaria (Walker, 1863)
 Semiothisa eleonora (Villers, 1789)
 Semiothisa erevanica Wardikjan, 1985
 Semiothisa frugaliata Guenée, 1858
 Semiothisa fuscataria Möschler, 1887
 Semiothisa fuscorufa (Prout, 1915)
 Semiothisa gambaria Hübner 1818
 Semiothisa hebetata (Hulst, 1881)
 Semiothisa idriasaria (Walker, 1860)
 Semiothisa infixaria (Walker, 1863)
 Semiothisa johnstoni (Butler, 1894)
 Semiothisa kilimanjarensis (Holland, 1892)
 Semiothisa kuschea Guedet, 1939
 Semiothisa latiscriptata (Walker, 1863)
 Semiothisa lautusaria (Swinhoe, 1902)
 Semiothisa maculosata Warren, 1896
 Semiothisa majestica Warren, 1901
 Semiothisa natalensis Warren, 1904
 Semiothisa neptaria (Guenee)
 Semiothisa normata (Walker, 1861)
 Semiothisa notata Linnaeus, 1758
 Semiothisa nubilata (Warren, 1897)
 Semiothisa olindaria (Swinhoe, 1904)
 Semiothisa orthostates (Prout, 1915)
 Semiothisa ostentosaria Möschler, 1887
 Semiothisa percnoptera (Prout, 1915)
 Semiothisa perfusaria Walker, 1866
 Semiothisa peyrierasi Viette, 1975
 Semiothisa procidata (Guenée, 1857)
 Semiothisa promiscuata Ferguson, 1974
 Semiothisa quadraria (Moore, 1887)
 Semiothisa rhabdophora (Holland, 1892)
 Semiothisa saburraria (Eversmann, 1851)
 Semiothisa semialbida (Prout, 1915
 Semiothisa shanghaisaria (Walker, 1862)
 Semiothisa subcretata Warren, 1905
 Semiothisa submarmorata (Walker)
 Semiothisa tancrearia Staudinger, 1892
 Semiothisa testaceata (Walker, 1863)
 Semiothisa troni Guillermet, 2011
 Semiothisa ulsterata Pearsall
 Semiothisa umbrata (Warren, 1897)
 Semiothisa umbratilis (Butler, 1875)
 Semiothisa uvidaria Swinhoe, 1904
 Semiothisa verecundaria (Leech, 1897)
 Semiothisa warreni (Prout, 1915)

Distribution
China.

References

Macariini
Geometridae genera